Milton Thomas McDougal (July 21, 1917 – April 2, 1984) was an American politician and farmer.

Born in Spruce, Wisconsin, McDougal was a farmer and livestock dealer. He was also involved in the electric cooperative. He served in the Wisconsin State Assembly from 1965 until 1972. He was elected as a Democrat. However, during the Wisconsin Legislature session of 1967, McDougal switched to the Republican Party. McDougal lived in Oconto Falls, Wisconsin.

Notes

Businesspeople from Wisconsin
Farmers from Wisconsin
20th-century American businesspeople
20th-century American politicians
1917 births
1984 deaths
People from Oconto County, Wisconsin
People from Oconto Falls, Wisconsin
Democratic Party members of the Wisconsin State Assembly
Republican Party members of the Wisconsin State Assembly